Schmutz is a 1985 Austrian drama film directed by Paulus Manker. It was entered into the 15th Moscow International Film Festival and was nominated for the Golden Prize. It won C.S.T. Award at Avoriaz Fantastic Film Festival (1986) and Best Director and Special Recommendation for the soundtrack at Ghent International Film Festival (1986).

Josef Schmutz is a custodian clerk given the task of guarding an outdated industrial plant. The film is an allegory on the obsessive outsider and the banal roots of totalitarianism.

Cast
 Fritz Schediwy as Joseph Schmutz
 Hans-Michael Rehberg as Oberkontrollor 
 Siggi Schwientek as Fux
 Josefin Platt
 Mareile Geisler
 Axel Böhmert
 Günter Bothur
 Constanzia Hochle 
 Hanno Pöschl

References

External links
 

1985 films
1985 drama films
Austrian drama films
1980s German-language films